White Rider is the fourth album by British white power rock band Skrewdriver, released in 1987. The name and the first titular song references the Ku Klux Klan, while its cover references D.W. Griffith's 1915 pro-KKK film, The Birth of a Nation.

Track listing
All of the songs were written by Ian Stuart Donaldson.
 "White Rider" – 3:19
 "Where Has Justice Gone" – 2:50
 "Strikeforce" – 2:51
 "Behind the Bars" – 3:27
 "Pride of a Nation" – 3:12
 "New Nation" – 4:41
 "The Snow Fell" – 5:07
 "I Can See the Fire" – 3:13
 "Thunder in the Cities" – 2:42
 "We Fight for Freedom" – 4:10
 "White Warriors" – 3:08
 "Built Up, Knocked Down" – 4:31

Personnel
 Ian Stuart – vocals
 Martin Cross – guitar
 Merv Shields – bass
 Mark Sutherland – drums

Release history

References

1987 albums
Skrewdriver albums